Inkululeko Suntele (30 April 1994 – 27 October 2017) was a Mosotho boxer. He competed in the men's bantamweight event at the 2016 Summer Olympics, where he was defeated by Bilel Mhamdi in the first round. He was the flag bearer for Lesotho during the closing ceremony. Suntele was stabbed to death in October 2017.

References

External links
 

1994 births
2017 deaths
Lesotho male boxers
Olympic boxers of Lesotho
Boxers at the 2016 Summer Olympics
Commonwealth Games competitors for Lesotho
Boxers at the 2014 Commonwealth Games
People murdered in Lesotho
Lesotho murder victims
Male murder victims
Deaths by stabbing
Bantamweight boxers